The 1967 Rhondda West by-election was a parliamentary by-election held on 9 March 1967 for the British House of Commons constituency of Rhondda West in Wales.

The seat had become vacant when the constituency's Labour Member of Parliament (MP), Iorwerth Thomas, died on 3 December 1966, aged 71. He had held the seat since the 1950 general election.

The result of the contest was a victory for the Labour candidate, Alec Jones, who won with a majority of 2,306 over Plaid Cymru's H. Vic Davies.

Jones represented the constituency until his death in March 1983. No by-election was held because of the imminence of the 1983 general election.

See also
Rhondda West (UK Parliament constituency)
1920 Rhondda West by-election
Rhondda
Lists of United Kingdom by-elections

References

UK General Elections since 1832 

By-elections to the Parliament of the United Kingdom in Welsh constituencies
1967 elections in the United Kingdom
1967 in Wales
1960s elections in Wales
History of Rhondda Cynon Taf